Lieutenant-Colonel Arthur William Lancelot Brewill  (17 May 1861 – 18 February 1923) was an architect based in Nottingham.

Background and family

He was the son of William Rastall Brewill (1804–1897) and Sophia (1820–1886). He was educated at University School with a private tutor. He married Clementine Katherine Thornley in 1881 in St. Andrew's Church, Nottingham. They had 3 sons and 2 daughters.
Arthur William Lancelot Brewill (Commander R.N. died 1966)
Lionel Colin Brewill (1889–1943) ARIBA
Basil Herbert Brewill (1895–1973)
Winifred Irene Brewill (born 1885)
Dorothy Sophia Brewill (born 1888)

Military career

He was made Lieutenant in the Robin Hood Rifles in 1881 which became the 7th (Robin Hood) Battalion of the Sherwood Foresters, taking over command of the Battalion on 31 July 1915 at Hooge when they were ordered to dig a new trench and connect the British line where it had been captured by the Germans.

He commanded the Battalion at the attack on the Hohenzollern Redoubt on 13 October 1915 He was mentioned in despatches and awarded the Distinguished Service Order.

Architect career

He studied architecture under Samuel Dutton Walker in Nottingham from 1877 to 1882. He studied at the Nottingham School of Art in 1882. He became a Fellow of the Royal Institute of British Architects on 21 November 1892, and was Surveyor to the Diocese of Southwell. 
 
He worked in partnership with Basil Edgar Baily from 1894 to 1922 in Nottingham. He was succeeded by his son, Lionel Colin Brewill.

He was appointed Fellow of the Royal Institute of British Architects in 1892.

Buildings

Beeston Police Station, Chilwell Road, Beeston (now Manor Pharmacy) 1878
1 Houndsgate, Nottingham 1883
88-94 Derby Road, Nottingham 1884
Riseholme (private house), Mapperley Park, Nottingham
1 Magdala Road, Mapperley Park, Nottingham
New Bolsover model village, Old Bolsover, Derbyshire 1891–1894
St. John's Church, Colston Bassett 1892 
Albert Mill, Gamble Street, Nottingham 1893
Church of the Holy Rood, Edwalton 1894 new chancel 
104–106 Lenton Boulevard, Nottingham 1895–1897
The Red House, 256 Melton Road, Edwalton 1896
St Columba's Church, Nottingham 1896, originally Presbyterian, then Church of Christ Scientist, now Sikh Temple
Bardencroft, Tweed Street, Saltburn 1897 
Friary United Reformed Church 1898 
Turkish Baths, Upper Parliament Street, Nottingham 1898 (demolished 1962)
St John the Baptist, South Witham, Lincolnshire 1898–1901
29 and 31, (Ram Hotel), Long Row, Nottingham 1899 
Creswell CofE Infants School, Elmton Road, Elmton, Bolsover, Derbyshire 1900 
Noel Street Presbyterian Church, Nottingham 1901
Long Eaton Wesleyan Methodist Church 1903–1904
Edwalton Hall, Nottingham 1907 
Carriageway Block, Queens Road, Nottingham 1908
Derby Road drill hall, Nottingham (later used by the Post Office, and now residential accommodation) 1910–1912
Nottingham Road Methodist Church, Mansfield 1913 
War Memorial at St Peter's Church, Ruddington c.1918
Pedestrian Bridge over Houndsgate, Nottingham 1920–1921
War Memorial at Burton Joyce 1920
Albert Ball Memorial Homes, Lenton, Nottingham 1921 
Memorial to Captain Albert Ball VC in Nottingham Castle 1921 
Memorial to the Robin Hood Battalion of the Sherwood Foresters in the chancel of St Mary's Church, Nottingham 1921
War Memorial at Nottingham High School 1922
War Memorial at Crich, Derbyshire 1923
White Lion Public House, Middle Street, Beeston

References

Fellows of the Royal Institute of British Architects
Architects from Nottingham
1923 deaths
1861 births
Sherwood Foresters officers
Companions of the Distinguished Service Order
British Army personnel of World War I